is a Japanese politician and the current mayor of Kobe, the capital city of Hyōgo Prefecture in Japan.

External links

References 

1954 births
Living people
People from Kobe
Politicians from Hyōgo Prefecture
Liberal Democratic Party (Japan) politicians
University of Tokyo alumni
Mayors of places in Japan